Indefinite Monism is a philosophical conception of reality that asserts that only Awareness is real and that the wholeness of Reality can be conceptually thought of in terms of immanent and transcendent aspects.  The immanent aspect is denominated simply as Awareness, while the transcendent aspect is  referred to as Omnific Awareness.  

Awareness in this system is not equivalent to consciousness.  Rather, Awareness is the venue for consciousness, and the transcendent aspect of Reality, Omnific Awareness, is what consciousness is of.  

In this system, what is real is distinguished from that which exists by showing that everything that we are conscious of exists but is not real since it is contingent upon awareness for its existence.  Awareness is the source of its own energetic display -- its omneity.  Rather than leading to a solipsistic account of reality, it is claimed through an analysis of consciousness that it is an error on our part to conceive of individuated awareness.  That error being found in a conflation of the objects of consciousness with the subject of consciousness within an assumed form of reality of separate physical things.  Proceeding from the one necessarily true and unquestionable fact – that we are present to our experiences – an understanding of reality is developed that is neither a materialist nor an idealist conceptualization.  This way of viewing the world is referred to as surjective, a metaphorical use of a concept found in mathematical set theory that means a function that works upon every member of a set, where Awareness is the function and Omnific Awareness is the set, in order to distinguish this position from both subjectivity and objectivity.

Within this system anything whatsoever can arise from Omnific Awareness, thus the use of the term “indefinite” in labeling this monism.  What does arise as the existents that we are conscious of is conditioned by the affections of Awareness for its display.  Thus this system does away with the idea of an active, creative force called Free Will and replaces it with an active volitional component known as affections, that does not itself create anything, whether movement or structure, but instead, constrains the possibilities of what arises naturally.  Arguably, the concept of Free Will necessitates a world of separation as it implies an actor and that which is acted upon.  In this conception there is no such separation.  Yet our intuitive modeling of the existents of reality as arising from natural processes, as well as our intuitive understanding that we can ‘cause’ things to happen by our ‘will’, are both cleanly supported.

The distinction between physical phenomena and mental phenomena is also removed by this system.  Omnific Awareness gives rise to everything – thus the use of the term omnific – and this includes thoughts that phenomenally arise in brains as well as existents that arise phenomenally as things in the world.  By removing this distinction this system cuts off the inevitable paradoxes that otherwise arise in philosophical systems.  The implications of this move create a number of novel, but necessary, modifications in current categorizations of ideas about reality and our study of it.  For instance, ontology – the study of being – is necessitated by the assumption of a physical world of separate things, but when viewed surjectively ontology collapses into epistemology – the study of the methods or grounds of knowledge.  Similarly, by removing the distinction between mental and physical phenomena the tensions created in dualist understandings of reality of how the mental and physical interact with one another are dispelled.  Surprisingly, the removal of this distinction also completely removes the need for claims of metaphysical realms of being or metaphysical processes, thus collapsing all of reality into this reality.

The implications of this view of Reality are carried as far as ethics, where the lack of separation between Awareness and that which it gives rise to necessitate a far-reaching adjustment in our ethical beliefs.  One such difference that is highlighted for instance is that all conscious beings, which are called “knowings” in deference to this new conception of reality, are qualitatively the same; thus our current distinction between “human beings” and “animals” is based upon a false dichotomy, and this new understanding will necessitate an adjustment in our ideas of who or what can be “property” and who or what can be a “person.”

See also 
 
 Advaita Vedanta
 Anaximander (Anaximander posited a monism which he described as "apeiron".)
 Neoplatonism
 Neutral monism
 Nonduality
 Open individualism
 Parmenides
 Vertiginous question

References 
 Corrigan, James M.: An Introduction to Awareness. BookSurge Publishing, 2006.
 McKirahan, Richard: Anaximander. In E. Craig (Ed.): Routledge Encyclopedia of Philosophy. London: Routledge, 1998.
 Menon, Krishna: Notes on Spiritual Discourses of Shri Atmananda. 1959. https://pgoodnight.files.wordpress.com/2010/07/notes-of-atmananda.pdf

Monism
Theory of mind
Consciousness studies
Metaphysical theories
Metaphysics of mind